Nogometni klub Pohorje, commonly referred to as NK Pohorje or simply Pohorje, is a Slovenian football club which plays in the town of Ruše. The club was established in 1956 and competes in the 1. MNZ Maribor League, the fourth highest league in Slovenia.

Honours

Slovenian Second League
Runners-up: 1998–99

Slovenian Third League
Winners: 1997–98, 2002–03
Runners-up: 1995–96, 1996–97

References

External links
Official website 

Association football clubs established in 1956
Football clubs in Slovenia
1956 establishments in Slovenia